Vanishing Time: A Boy Who Returned is a 2016 South Korean fantasy film written and directed by Um Tae-hwa and starring Gang Dong-won and Shin Eun-soo. This is the second feature film by Um Tae-hwa. The idea of the film was strongly influenced by the sinking of MV Sewol which occurred in 2014. Um explained that after the Sewol disaster, the government tried to hide the truth, and therefore he decided to shoot a film the main theme of which is a search for truth.

Synopsis
A 13-year-old boy named Sung-min and his two friends went missing after their venture into a cave in a forest, along with a girl, Su-rin. Later, a mysterious man in his 30s shows up and tells Su-rin that he is her friend Sung-min.

Cast

Gang Dong-won as Sung-min
Shin Eun-soo as Soo-rin
Lee Hyo-je as Sung-min (young)
Kim Hee-won as Do-kyun
Kwon Hae-hyo as Baek-ki
Uhm Tae-goo as Tae-shik
Kim Dan-yool as Tae-shik (young)
Jung Woo-jin as Jae-wook
Park Jong-hwan as Jin-sung
Park Jin-woo as Tae-shik's father
Park Sung-yeon as Tae-shik's mother
Kim Tae-han as Jae-wook's father 
Kim Jung-young as Jae-wook's mother
Oh Hee-joon as Search police
Kim Hak-sun as Section chief Park
Seo Joo-hee as Orphanage director
Ahn Ji-ho as Sang-chul
Ahn Sang-woo as Sang-chul's father
Ok Jae-sub as Tae-shik's grandfather

Moon So-ri as Dr. Min (cameo)

Awards and nominations

References

External links
 
 
 
 

South Korean fantasy films
2016 films
Showbox films
2016 fantasy films
2010s South Korean films